Seed 97.5 FM is a radio station owned and operated by MCOT and based in Bangkok, Thailand. It broadcasts over the 97.5 MHz FM frequency in the Greater Bangkok area, and is repeated nationwide through MCOT Radio's regional network.

Seed 97.5 FM ceased broadcasting on 1 January 2017. It was replaced by 97.5 Keep It Mellow.

References

External links
 Official website

Radio stations in Thailand
Mass media in Bangkok
Defunct radio stations